Midnight (real name: Dave Clark) is a fictional character owned by DC Comics. A masked detective, he was created by writer-artist Jack Cole for Quality Comics during the 1930s to 1940s period fans and historians call the Golden Age of Comic Books.

A female supervillain alien version of Midnight appeared in the fifth season of Supergirl, portrayed by actress Jennifer Cheon Garcia.

Publication history
With writer-artist Will Eisner retaining rights to the masked-detective character the Spirit, Quality Comics publisher "Busy" Arnold, who published the comic-book version of this newspaper character, desired a hedge in case Eisner were killed or incapacitated during World War II. Arnold directed Jack Cole to create a similar character, which became Midnight. Midnight debuted in Smash Comics #18 (cover-dated Jan. 1941). The character became popular enough to become the cover feature with Smash Comics #28 (Nov. 1941), a position he would hold for nearly eight years until the title's cancellation with issue #85 (Oct. 1949).

Fictional character biography

Dave Clark
Dave Clark is a radio announcer in Big City. He is an actor in a show named "The Man Called Midnight", about a masked crime fighter. After witnessing the collapse of a twelve-story building, he finds out that it had collapsed as a result of deliberate criminal negligence on the part of its builder, Morris Carleton.  Clark decides to fight Carleton and force him to admit responsibility. To do this, he puts on a domino mask and assumes the identity of Midnight himself. After succeeding, he chooses to continue to fight crime as "Midnight, the eerie friend of the needy".

In Smash Comics #21, Midnight encounters the intelligent talking monkey Gabby. By the end of the story, the death of the scientist responsible leaves Gabby in Midnight's care, and the monkey becomes Midnight's sidekick. In Smash Comics #23, Midnight and Gabby face off against mad scientist Doc Wackey who, once captured, is talked into reforming and joins forces with Midnight. Doc Wackey and Gabby would continue to serve as Midnight's sidekicks (and often comic relief) for the remainder of Midnight's run on the title.  

According to Jess Nevins' Encyclopedia of Golden Age Superheroes, Midnight "fights ordinary gangsters, the magician Chango (whose spells are in Pig Latin), the femme fatale Circle, the maniacal Laughing Killer, the Men from Mars, the Amazonian Robustia, and others".

Midnight was killed in Smash Comics #36, where he went to Hell at his own request so that he could attempt to fight the Devil himself. Midnight was resurrected at the end of the chapter thanks to a mad scientist. Eventually two more colorful characters joined the gang, inept private detective Sniffer Snoop and his pet Hotfoot, a baby polar bear.

Like the other Quality characters, Midnight was bought by DC Comics after Quality Comics folded in 1956, but has not been extensively used. Like most other Golden Age heroes, he made an appearance in Roy Thomas' All-Star Squadron, which Thomas used to feature every Golden Age character owned by DC. He also worked with the Freedom Fighters for some time.

In his sole post-Crisis appearance, a revised version of Midnight's origin written by Thomas and drawn by Gil Kane was published in Secret Origins #28.  His base of operations was retconned into New York City. Midnight has not appeared since, and nothing is known of his fate after the 1940s.

Midnight II
A new Midnight was introduced in the 1990s in Ms. Tree Quarterly, but whether this Midnight has any connection to the original is unknown.

Jack Sheridan
Jack Sheridan first appeared as Midnight in the backup story of "Bug! The Adventures of Forager", "Midnight in the Phantom Zone" by James Harvey from issues #3 to 6. Jack Sheridan's biography seems to be identical to that of Dave Clark's, referring to his job as a radio presenter, actor in  "The Man Called Midnight", as well as his association with Doc Wackey and Gabby. Additionally Jack refers to his time in Hell at which point the reader is referred to Smash Comics #36. 

He is said to be equipped with a "vacuum gun", a "2-way radio" and a "suit equipped with light-receptive vantablack filaments".

This iteration of Midnight is not traditionally heroic, as he mentions that he has multiple vices and seeks monetary compensation from a homeless man for his assistance.

Midnight enters the Phantom Zone against his will, handcuffed to criminal Sally Mae, to save her gang's leader, who became lost within. They are guided by a Kryptonian named Dig. For reasons which are unclear, it was necessary for Midnight to sacrifice himself so that the other three in his party might leave the Phantom Zone.

Other versions
 In the Elseworlds miniseries JLA: Destiny, by John Arcudi and Tom Mandrake, a version of Midnight exists in a world where Superman and Batman do not exist. This version of Midnight, named William Cole, is a former detective with the Gotham City Police Department and a senior member of Thomas Wayne's Justice League of America, formerly the Justice League of Gotham, as Midnight.

In other media
A female version of the character appeared in the fifth season of Supergirl portrayed by Jennifer Cheon Garcia. This version is an alien villain with vortex-based abilities and was imprisoned in the Phantom Zone. Ma'alefa'ak steals Kryptonian technology from a museum and uses it to free Midnight from the Phantom Zone. In her first encounter with Supergirl, Alex Danvers, Brainiac 5, and Martian Manhunter, Supergirl suspected that she will come after her because her mother Alura sent different villains to the Phantom Zone only for Martian Manhunter to admit that he was the one who banished her to the Phantom Zone for leading a White Martian attack. When Midnight attacks an evening party held by Lena Luthor, Kara uses her new suit created by Brainiac 5 to stop a black hole caused by Midnight. Afterwards, Midnight is sent back into the Phantom Zone using a Phantom Zone projector.

External links
 Midnight by Jack Cole from Smash Comics #32 originally copyrighted in 1942 by E.M. Arnold
 Internationalhero page

References

Golden Age superheroes
Comics characters introduced in 1941
Quality Comics superheroes
DC Comics superheroes
Fictional actors
Characters created by Jack Cole